Acestrilla minima is a species of beetle in the family Cerambycidae, and the only species in the genus Acestrilla. It was described by  Bates in 1885.

References

Apomecynini
Beetles described in 1885
Monotypic Cerambycidae genera